Chana station is a railway station located in Ban Na Subdistrict, Chana District, Songkhla.

Bombings 
 On 11 April 2016, a bomb hidden in a motorcycle blew up in front of the railway station at 17:30, resulting in 2 deaths (1 police, 1 4-year-old boy) and 8 injuries. All injured were sent to Chana Hospital. The event was part of the South Thailand Insurgency.

Services 
 Special Express No. 37/38 Bangkok-Sungai Kolok-Bangkok
 Rapid No. 169/170 Bangkok-Yala-Bangkok
 Rapid No. 171/172 Bangkok-Sungai Kolok-Bangkok
 Rapid No. 175/176 Hat Yai Junction-Sungai Kolok-Hat Yai Junction
 Local No. 447/448 Surat Thani-Sungai Kolok-Surat Thani
 Local No. 451/452 Nakhon Si Thammarat-Sungai Kolok-Nakhon Si Thammarat
 Local No. 455/456 Nakhon Si Thammarat-Yala-Nakhon Si Thammarat
 Local No. 463/464 Phatthalung-Sungai Kolok-Phatthalung

References 

 
 

Railway stations in Thailand